Muhammadjon Shakuri (February 1925, in Bukhara – September 16, 2012, in Dushanbe), also known as Muhammad Sharifovich Shukurov, was a prominent Tajik intellectual and one of the notable literary figures of the Persian language of the 20th century. From the late 1980s, during glasnost, he cultivated an interest in the theory of modern Tajik culture, and he published copiously on the issues of the history and contemporary conditions of Tajik language, literature, and culture during the independence period after 1991.

Among his main works is a Tajiki-Persian dictionary. He also had a significant role in preserving Tajik identity.

Awards and honors
Iran's Eternal Figure Award (2005)
Permanent member of Academy of Persian Language and Literature (1996)
Permanent member of Tajik Academy of Sciences

See also 
Iranistics
Layeq Shir-Ali
Golrokhsar Safi Eva

References

Iraj Bashiri, Prominent Tajik Figures of the Twentieth Century, International Borbad Foundation, Academy of Sciences of Tajikistan, Dushanbe, 2003.

External links 
Tajikistan's national scholar: Mohammad Shakouri

Ethnic Tajik people
Iranologists
Tajikistani writers
1925 births
2012 deaths
Members of the Academy of Persian Language and Literature
Members of the Tajik Academy of Sciences